Nanny and Nanko were two goats and First Pets of America which were owned by Abraham Lincoln. These goats were the gift of Lincoln to his son, Tad Lincoln when his son wanted a goat and his son liked these goats very much. His sons Tad Lincoln and William Wallace Lincoln played with these goats inside and outside of the White House.

Biography 
In the 1860s, Lincoln shared his home with these goats. Abraham Lincoln and his family enjoyed the goats while living in the White House. Sometimes, they chewed up the furniture of the White House. They grazed on the grounds of the White House. After the assassination of Abraham Lincoln, his widow Mary Todd Lincoln, gave the goats away to a friend. According to Lincoln, they were the best and kindest goats in the world as he loved goats.

References 

Individual animals in the United States
Abraham Lincoln